Neocrex is a genus of birds in the family Rallidae. The birds are indigenous to Central and South America.

Species
It contains the following species:

References

External links

Neocrex
Bird genera
Higher-level bird taxa restricted to the Neotropics
Taxa named by Philip Sclater
Taxa named by Osbert Salvin
Taxonomy articles created by Polbot